Rugby Municipal Airport  is a public use airport located two nautical miles (4 km) northwest of the central business district of Rugby, a city in Pierce County, North Dakota, United States. It is owned by the Rugby Airport Authority. This airport is included in the National Plan of Integrated Airport Systems for 2011–2015, which categorized it as a general aviation facility.

Although many U.S. airports use the same three-letter location identifier for the FAA and IATA, this airport is assigned RUG by the FAA but has no designation from the IATA (which assigned RUG to Rugao Air Base in Rugao, China).

Facilities and aircraft 
Rugby Municipal Airport covers an area of 280 acres (113 ha) at an elevation of 1,548 feet (472 m) above mean sea level. It has one runway designated 12/30 with an asphalt surface measuring 3,604 by 60 feet (1,098 x 18 m).

For the 12-month period ending September 3, 2011, the airport had 4,050 aircraft operations, an average of 11 per day: 91% general aviation, 7% air taxi, and 1% military. At that time there were 14 aircraft based at this airport: 86% single-engine, 7% multi-engine, and 7% ultralight.

References

External links 
 Rugby Municipal (RUG) at North Dakota Aeronautics Commission airport directory
 Aerial image as of June 1995 from USGS The National Map
 

Airports in North Dakota
Buildings and structures in Pierce County, North Dakota
Transportation in Pierce County, North Dakota